The Orion 50 is a sailboat designed by American Gary Mull and first built in 1983. The design is out of production.

Production
The boat was built by Ta Shing Yacht Building in Taiwan, which completed seven examples between 1983 and 1987.

Design
The Orion 50 is a recreational keelboat, built predominantly of fiberglass, with wood trim. It has a masthead ketch rig, a skeg-mounted rudder and a fixed fin keel. It displaces  and carries  of lead ballast.

The fresh water tank holds  and the diesel fuel tank also holds .

The boat has a PHRF racing average handicap of 126 with a high of 126 and low of 126.

See also
List of sailing boat types

References

Keelboats
1980s sailboat type designs
Sailing yachts
Sailboat type designs by Gary Mull
Sailboat types built by Ta Shing Yacht Building